The 14th National People's Congress is the current meeting of the legislative branch and, constitutionally, the supreme authority of the People's Republic of China. It convened in Beijing, on 5 March 2023, and is scheduled to continue until March 2028. Elections for the new Congress were held from October 2022 to February 2023. It is scheduled to hold five sessions in this period, occurring around early March every year until before 2028, when the 15th National People's Congress is expected to be elected from December 2027 to February 2028 and will likely be in session around March 2028.

Seat distribution

The first session

Elections

Presidential election

Election results

References

External links 
  Official website of the NPC

National People's Congresses
2022 in China
2023 in China
2022 elections in China
2023 elections in China